Fox-1Cliff, AO-95 or AMSAT OSCAR 95 is an American amateur radio satellite.  Fox-1Cliff is a 1U CubeSat built by AMSAT-NA that carries a single-channel transponder for mode U/V in FM.

The satellite carries several student experiments:

 Vanderbilt University Low Energy Proton (LEP) radiation experiment (flight spare from Fox-1A)
 Penn State University Erie gyroscope experiment

It also carries a VGA camera provided by Virginia Tech.

Mission 

Fox-1Cliff was launched on 3 December, 2018 via Falcon 9 Block 5 from Vandenberg Air Force Base, California, United States.

Receiver failure 
Shortly after deployment, AO-95's receiver suffered a failure due to unknown reasons.

Name 
The satellite is the third of five Fox-1 satellites, and was originally named Fox-1C.  In 2016, it was renamed Fox-1Cliff in honor of Cliff Buttschardt, a long time member of AMSAT and a contributor to the project, who died earlier that year.  After its launch, Fox-1Cliff was renamed AO-95.

See also 

 Fox-1A
 Fox-1B
 Fox-1D

References 

Satellites orbiting Earth
Amateur radio satellites
Spacecraft launched in 2018